Cathedral Park is a park and the name for the eponymous neighborhood in the northernmost section of Portland, Oregon on the east shore of the Willamette River. The park is situated under the St. Johns Bridge, and was given its name due to the Gothic arches that support the bridge, which resemble a cathedral arch.

History
The land the park occupies was originally part of the city of St. Johns. The St. Johns Bridge opened in 1931, but at that time there was no park. In August 1949, a fifteen-year-old girl named Thelma Taylor was kidnapped and murdered under the bridge in the space where the park now exists. According to local folklore, due to this, the park is supposedly haunted. In 1968, the city acquired the land under the bridge, which became a dumping ground. Residents then raised $7.5 million in the 1970s to build a park on the site, which opened on May 3, 1980. A sculpture by Donald Fels was added to the park in 2008, entitled "Drawing on the River". In August 2013, the amphitheater hosted the final "Trek in the Park" performance put on by the Atomic Arts group. The boat ramp was used as a staging area for protests in 2015 against the MSV Fennica, an icebreaker used by Shell Oil.

Recreation
The park contains several walking trails, picnic benches, as well as a floating dock that extends onto the Willamette River. It also is home to a small outdoor stage, where the city has held an annual summer jazz festival since 1980. The Cathedral Park Jazz Fest is the oldest free jazz festival west of the Mississippi River. Cathedral Park also contains a boat ramp on the north end of the park. It is considered a popular location for weddings.

See also

 List of parks in Portland, Oregon
 Reportedly haunted locations in Oregon

References

External links

Trees of Cathedral Park

1980 establishments in Oregon
Cathedral Park, Portland, Oregon
Parks in Portland, Oregon
Protected areas established in 1980
Reportedly haunted locations in Portland, Oregon